Devonte Vincent Redmond (born 19 September 1996) is an English professional footballer who plays as a midfielder for United Arab Emirates club Gulf United.

Redmond began his career with the academy of Manchester United, but left in 2018 without making an appearance. He made his professional debut while on loan at Scunthorpe United. After leaving United, he signed for Salford City, helping them achieve promotion to the English Football League for the first time in their history, before leaving for Wrexham, where he spent three years including a loan spell at Kidderminster Harriers.

Club career
Born in Manchester, Redmond formally signed for Manchester United in July 2013 from Fletcher Moss Rangers, although he had been associated with the club since the age of 8. During his time in the youth system at Old Trafford, he won the U21 Premier League twice and played in the UEFA Youth League.

In July 2017, he joined League One side Scunthorpe United on a loan deal until January 2018. Redmond made his debut for Scunthorpe against Notts County in the EFL Cup on 8 August 2017, coming on for Sam Mantom in the 89th minute while the score was 3–3. He scored in the following penalty shoot-out which saw Scunthorpe win 6–5. He was recalled by Manchester United in January 2018.

He was one of eight players released by Manchester United at the end of the 2017–18 season; He later said that he found out via Twitter.

In June 2018, he went on trial with Shrewsbury Town.

Salford City
National League side Salford City signed Redmond on 31 January 2019. His first goal for the club came on 18 March, scoring the only goal in a 1–0 win against Aldershot Town, helping close the gap to league leaders Leyton Orient to four points. Overall, he started 11 of Salford's final 12 league fixtures as they reached the National League play-offs.

On 11 May 2019, Salford defeated Fylde 3–0 in the play-off Final, with Redmond contributing heavily to the opening goal from Emmanuel Dieseruvwe; this marked the first time Salford had ever reached the Football League. It was announced at the end of May that he had been offered a new deal by the club, but had decided to pursue his career elsewhere, and would leave the club at the end of June when his contract expired.

Wrexham
On 8 June 2019, Redmond signed for Wrexham on a two-year deal. On 3 August, he made his début for Wrexham on the opening day of the National League season, starting in a 2–1 home win against Barrow. He scored his first for the club in a 1–1 draw on 18 August, a "magnificent" strike earning Wrexham a point away to Notts County. On 2 June 2022, Wrexham released six players including Redmond.

Kidderminster Harriers (loan)
On 14 January 2022, Redmond joined National League North side Kidderminster Harriers on loan until the end of the season.

United Arab Emirates
The following season, he signed for UAE Second Division League side Gulf United.

Personal life
Redmond is the son of former left-back Paul Edwards, who made appearances in the English Football League for six different clubs.

Career statistics

Honours
Salford City
National League play-offs: 2019

References

1996 births
Living people
English footballers
Association football midfielders
Fletcher Moss Rangers F.C. players
Manchester United F.C. players
Scunthorpe United F.C. players
Salford City F.C. players
Wrexham A.F.C. players
Kidderminster Harriers F.C. players
English Football League players
National League (English football) players
Black British sportspeople
Footballers from Manchester
English expatriate footballers
Expatriate footballers in the United Arab Emirates
English expatriate sportspeople in the United Arab Emirates
UAE Second Division League players